= Crisis of Growth Politics: Cleveland, Kucinich, and the Challenge of Urban Populism =

1985 book by Todd Swanstrom

The Crisis of Growth Politics
- Author: Todd Swanstrom
- Language: English
- Subject: Urban politics of Cleveland, Ohio; Dennis Kucinich
- Publisher: Temple University Press
- Publication date: 1985
- Publication place: United States
- Media type: Print
- Pages: 307
- ISBN: 0-87722-366-1
- OCLC: 10998718

The Crisis of Growth Politics: Cleveland, Kucinich, and the Challenge of Urban Populism is a 1985 book by the American political scientist Todd Swanstrom published by Temple University Press. Swanstrom revised it from his doctoral dissertation at Princeton University in 1981. The book won the Best Book Award from the urban politics section of the American Political Science Association.
